Senator Kline may refer to:

Adam W. Kline (1818–1898), New York State Senate
Adam Kline (born 1944), Washington State Senate
Charles H. Kline (1870–1933), Pennsylvania State Senate
Ernest Kline (1929–2009), Pennsylvania State Senate

See also
Senator Klein (disambiguation)